WWGC AM 1090 is a radio station licensed to serve Albertville, Alabama.  The station is owned by The Jeff Beck Broadcasting Group, LLC.  It airs a Latino Music programming format.

The station has been assigned the WWGC call letters by the Federal Communications Commission since April 24, 2002.

References

External links

WGC
Hispanic and Latino American culture in Alabama
Radio stations established in 1982
1982 establishments in Alabama
WGC